Monsignor Vicente Faustino Zazpe Zarategi (15 February 1920 – 24 January 1984) was an archbishop of the Roman Catholic Church of Argentina.

Zazpe (also sometimes spelled Zaspe) was born to Spanish Navarre immigrants in Santa Fe. He attended Buenos Aires Medical School and was ordained priest on 28 November 1948. After Pope John XXIII had appointed him Bishop of Rafaela on 12 June 1961, he took part in the Second Vatican Council. He succeeded as archbishop of Santa Fe on 13 August 1969.

See also
 Edgardo Gabriel Storni
 Enrique Angelelli
 Roman Catholic Archdiocese of Santa Fe de la Vera Cruz

References

Literature

External links
 Catholic Hierarchy. 
 Centro de estudios Hispanoamericanos 

Participants in the Second Vatican Council
1920 births
1984 deaths
Roman Catholic bishops of Rafaela
20th-century Roman Catholic archbishops in Argentina
Roman Catholic archbishops of Santa Fe de la Vera Cruz